Jón Pétursson can refer to:

 Jón Pétursson (athlete) (1936-2003), Icelandic Olympic athlete
 Jón Pétursson (sailor) (born 1967), Icelandic Olympic sailor